Coleto Creek Reservoir is a reservoir on Coleto Creek and Perdido Creek located in Fannin, Texas, 15 miles (24 km) southwest of Victoria, Texas.  The surface of the lake extends into Victoria and Goliad counties.  The reservoir was formed in 1980 by the construction of a dam by the Guadalupe-Blanco River Authority to provide a power station cooling pond for electric power generation.  Coleto Creek Reservoir is a venue for outdoor recreation, including fishing and boating.

Fish and plant life
Coleto Creek Reservoir has been stocked with species of fish intended to improve the utility of the reservoir for recreational fishing.  Fish present in the reservoir include white bass, hybrid striped bass, catfish, crappie, sunfish, bluegill, and largemouth bass.  Vegetation in the lake includes cattail, pondweed, American lotus, rushes, and hydrilla.

Recreational uses

The Guadalupe-Blanco River Authority maintains a public park at the reservoir with recreational facilities for boating and fishing.

Climate

According to the Köppen Climate Classification system, the area has a humid subtropical climate, abbreviated "Cfa" on climate maps.

References

External links
Coleto Creek Reservoir - Guadalupe-Blanco River Authority
Coleto Creek Reservoir - Texas Parks & Wildlife
Coleto Creek - Handbook of Texas Online

Reservoirs in Texas
Protected areas of Goliad County, Texas
Protected areas of Victoria County, Texas
Bodies of water of Goliad County, Texas
Bodies of water of Victoria County, Texas
Cooling ponds
Guadalupe-Blanco River Authority